Bartosz Opania (born 12 December 1970, Puławy) is a Polish film, television and theatre actor.

Life and career
He was born on 12 December 1970 in Puławy to father Marian Opania and mother Anna. He played his first roles in Jacek Bromski's political thriller 1969. Szczęśliwego Nowego Roku (1969. Happy New Year) alongside Krzysztof Kolberger and Piotr Machalica and Magdalena Łazarkiewicz's 1992 film Białe małżeństwo (White Marriage) starring Jan Englert and Jolanta Fraszyńska. In 1992, he also made his first TV appearance in Jacek Bromski's Kuchnia polska programme. In 1993, he graduated from the National Academy of Dramatic Art in Warsaw.

In 1993, he played a gay character in Piotr Łazarkiewicz's drama Pora na czarownice (The Time of the Witches). In 1994, he made his theatre debut playing in Witold Gombrowicz's Ivona, Princess of Burgundia at the Warsaw's Ateneum Theatre.

In 1995, he starred in Krzysztof Zanussi's film Cwał and Kazimierz Kutz's political comedy Pułkownik Kwiatkowski (Colonel Kwiatkowski). For his portrayal of Józef Andryszek in Jan Jakub Kolski's 1998 film Historia kina w Popielawach (History of the Cinema in Popielawy), he received his first nomination for the Polish Film Award for Best Actor.

His other notable roles include films like Barbara Sass's Jak narkotyk (1999), Jan Jakub Kolski's Keep Away from the Window (2000) and Michał Rosa's Silence (2001). He also played in TV series such as Teraz albo nigdy! (2008) and Na dobre i na złe.

Appearances in film and television
1992: Kuchnia polska as Jarek, Piotr's friend (episode 4)
1993: Białe małżeństwo as Beniamin
1993: Pora na czarownice as Bartek
1995: Pułkownik Kwiatkowski as a Home Army prisoner
1995: Cwał as stableman
1997: Taekwondo as young Pole
1997: Linia opóźniająca as Paweł
1998: Historia kina w Popielawach as Józef Andryszek I
1999: Jak narkotyk as Piotr Pawłowski/Jurek
2000: Keep Away from the Window as Jan
2000: A Very Christmas Story as Miki
2000: Zakochani as Mateusz
2001-2018: Na dobre i na złe as Witold Latoszek
2001: Cisza as Szymon
2001: Córka as Jan
2003: Sukces as Wiktor
2004: Cudownie ocalony as Witold
2006: Statyści as Romek
2007: Pitbull as Lejczak (episode 14)
2008−2009: Teraz albo nigdy! as Bartosz Wróblewski
2009: Pod wiatr nie popłynie słodki zapach kwiatów as Andrzej
2009: Blondynka as Selim Goraj
2010: Usta usta as Jarek (episode 24)
2011: Battle of Warsaw 1920 as pułkownik Bolesław Jaźwiński
2011: Głęboka woda as Karol Tomiak (episode 7)
2013: Prawo Agaty as Andrzej Król (episode 46)
2014: Wkręceni as Zenobiusz „Fikoł” Kozioł
2015: Wkręceni 2 as Zenobiusz „Fikoł” Kozioł
2017: Druga szansa as Maciej Leonetti (season 3, episodes 1, 2, 3, 4, 5)

See also
Polish cinema
Polish Film Awards

References

1970 births
Living people
Polish male actors
People from Puławy
Aleksander Zelwerowicz National Academy of Dramatic Art in Warsaw alumni